Imam Quli is a Turkic-derived Muslim male given name meaning 'slave of the Imam'. It is built from quli.

People 
 Imam Quli Khan of Bukhara
 Imam Quli Khan (Safavid governor)
 Imam Quli Khan of Kakheti

Derived surnames